Graham John Cawthorne (born 30 September 1958) is an English former professional footballer who played as a defender.

References

1958 births
Living people
Footballers from Doncaster
English footballers
Association football defenders
Harworth Colliery F.C. players
Grimsby Town F.C. players
Doncaster Rovers F.C. players
Spalding United F.C. players
English Football League players